Power Instinct, released in Japan as , is a fighting video game series created by Atlus.

The series is known for its absurdist humor. Unique to the series was the introduction of the transformation feature: several of the characters can change their appearance and fighting style by simply executing certain moves (usually a throwing move), though this has not been featured in every entry in the series. Other features include the ability for every character to perform a double jump, run, and attack while running.

Games

Power Instinct 

In it, players play as a member of the Gōketsuji clan, who are battling to determine who will replace 78-year-old Oume Gōketsuji as head of the clan. It has eight selectable characters and one unplayable boss character, Oume Gōketsuji, a palette-swap of her younger sister Otane. Originally, every character had a specific win quote for each defeated foe, but that was reduced to only one win quote for each character in the English version.

This game was ported to the Super NES and the Sega Mega Drive. The Super NES version includes some new play modes: Vs. Battle, Practice Mode, Time Attack and a "Life Attack" that consists of defeating as many opponents as possible with just one life bar (similar to the Survival Modes seen in other fighting games).

The Mega Drive version, which was never released outside of Japan, has a Battle Royal mode where 1 or 2 players can select a team, with an option to hide the characters being chosen so they are not revealed until the fight. Additionally, it features an option that allows the strength of each special attack of every playable character to be adjusted to the player's liking.

The English console version of this game, which was only released in North America, had several omitted features, such as Karaoke Mode with the lyrics for the songs "Tatanka no Uta" and "Otoko no Karatemichi", character biographies that pop up in between demos, the intro demo to the game and the scene of Oume where she speaks to the player before she fights them (which changes if she's fighting Otane). The North American Super NES version also replaces the endings that were in the Japanese Super Famicom version with a congratulations screen with the character portraits used in the pre-fight screen.

Characters 
 Angela Belti (アンジェラ・ベルテ) – Angela is an Italian strongwoman. Although she has a very rough lifestyle and a love for heavy metal music, Angela Belti is very passionate and tends to fall in love easily. She is very tall, and very strong, even stronger than most men and as revealed in her ending, quite a bon vivant woman.
 Annie Hamilton (アニー・ハミルトン) – Born in the country of England, Annie Hamilton is a calm and compassionate woman born within a rich family. She is at times overbearing and bossy, due to her spoiled upbringing. However she loves animals, and currently has six dogs, four cats, three horses and a turtle named Kensington.
 Keith Wayne (キース・ウェイン) – Keith is a playboy who likes to flirt with women, which is one of the reasons that he enters the Gōketsuji tournament. Eventually, he met Annie Hamilton, who became the love of his life and since then, he has been determined to prove that he's the right guy for her.
  – As a child, Otane was constantly berated and abused by her older sister, Oume, and was neglected by her own mother, Oshima, due to her unwillingness to fight back. After many years of facing Oume's abuse, Otane decided to leave home at the age of 15 with only one thing on mind: train endlessly so that one day, she could beat Oume and prove that she is a worthy leader of the Gōketsuji clan.
  – Oume, like her younger sister Otane, is a superhuman. To master her mysterious attacks, she confined herself to the mountains. Moreover, she has an eerie and unearthly presence about her and it is rumored that she can turn her opponents to stone just by gazing into their eyes.
  – Reiji is a very straightforward and honest Japanese fighter and is the ultimate training fanatic. He does not do well with minute details, but excels at physical strength matches. He works part-time for a construction company to exert his excess energy. He is somewhat a parody of Ryu from Street Fighter and many other karate warriors like Ryo Sakazaki and Robert Garcia from Art of Fighting.
  – Saizo is a dark ninja who keeps his emotions hidden. He normally hides behind a ninja mask to avoid the contact with others, although on some occasions, his part-time job requires him to appear on stage in an animal costume.
  – Thin Nen is a violent Shaolin monk with obscene desires. This religious man studied ancient rituals to gain mystic powers and will do everything to get what he wants, whether it be women, food or money.
 White Buffalo (ホワイト・バッファロー) – White Buffalo is a Native American who tries to protect the rights of his people at all costs. A man of few words, he appreciates the little things in life.

Reception
In Japan, Game Machine listed Power Instinct on their January 1, 1994 issue as being the most-successful table arcade unit of the month. Reviewing the Super NES version, GamePro judged that "Power Instinct falls along the lines of Fatal Fury, but it falls short." They praised the double jumps and special moves, but criticized the "passable" graphics and sound and the fact that the boss is just a palette swap of a playable character. A reviewer for Next Generation said the game has "average graphics, decent play control, and moves you've mostly seen before. ... Nothing wrong here, it's just typical." He gave the Super NES version two out of five stars.

Power Instinct 2 

The game's story picks off from the last game, with Otane having defeated her sister Oume in the previous tournament. However, with the help of their mother Oshima Gōketsuji, Oume kidnapped her sister, threw her into the ocean, and forged a letter saying that Otane has quit as leader, resulting in a new tournament. Otane does escape and fights the winner of the tournament in a bid to defend her leadership of the Gōketsuji clan.

The game introduces the "Stress" meter into the series, which increases when one's attacks are blocked or when attacked. A super attack can be executed when it is full. In addition, when the Stress meter fills up, a character becomes engulfed in a flame of their own energy for a brief moment, which protects from any incoming attacks from the opponent and knocks them away if they are too close.

The PlayStation version, retitled , was only released in Japan. As the subtitle might indicate, it shares some characteristics from Gogetsuji Legends (described below), like the team battle and the possibility to play as Chuck and Kuroko, but these features are only available for Versus (player vs. player) mode. Unlike the arcade game, anytime a transformable character changed into his or her alternate version in the PlayStation port, there was considerable loading time that interrupted the match.

New characters 
  – Known to be the matriarch of the entire Gōketsuji clan, Oshima Gōketsuji is known for her strict policies and precise personality to make her clan the strongest throughout the entire world. She's the mother of both Otane and Oume Gōketsuji and often favors Oume over Otane, due to the fact that Oume takes up most of her own personality traits.
  – A magical witch who uses her special powers and magical wand for her own benefits, Kurara Hanakouji seeks to have much fun and excitement during her travels throughout the world. Even though she looks like a 15-year-old, Kurara's exact age is unknown. When she gains enough power from a fight, she can change into her alter-ego, Super Kurara (a woman who wears roller-skates while fighting in scantily-clad clothing). In Matrimelee, her name is changed to Clara. She also stars in her own spin-off game, Purikura Daisakusen, and appears as an unlockable character in the PlayStation version of Heaven's Gate, another Atlus fighting game.
  – An old man who is the ex-husband of Oume Gōketsuji, Kanji Kokuin now seeks to defeat the members of the Gōketsuji clan so that he can gain full control over the clan. He starts the battle off with his pumped-up muscles, but if he fails from within the initiation of his super move, he loses his strength and turns into a prickly man who only fights with his walking cane.
  – A young kindergartner who is the grandson of Haruki, Kanji Kokuin's younger brother, Kinta Kokuin is known for being an obnoxious brat who takes up most of his grandfather's personality traits and that he won't stop until he gets what he wants. He fights in the tournament in order to impress a girl that he likes and he uses the assistance of his pets (a huge fish and a bear) to aid him. When he gains enough strength from within a fight, Kinta can transform into his alter-ego, Pochi (a man wearing a dog costume who fights by throwing power bones at the opponent).
 Sahad Asran Ryuto (サハド・アスラーン・リュート) – An Arabian man who uses both his fighting skills and the power of the djinn from a magic lamp. Sahad's goal is to not only test out his abilities in battle, but to also impress Angela Belti, upon whom he has a crush.

Reception 
In Japan, Game Machine listed Power Instinct 2 on their November 1, 1994 issue as being the third most-successful table arcade unit of the month. On release, Famicom Tsūshin scored the PlayStation version of the game a 23 out of 40.

Gogetsuji Legends 

This installment lacks the Power Instinct title in its localization; this would be a trend for the series in its subsequent western releases, officially phasing out the Power Instinct branding. However, the game was incorrectly listed in MAME as Power Instinct Legends, although the naming error has since been fixed. The game's story picks up from the last game, with Otane being defeated by Kanji Kokuin, who became the new leader of the Gouketsuji clan.

This game is a sort of "update" to Power Instinct 2. All previous characters reappear, plus a few new characters. Super Kurara and Pochi are individual characters; because of this, Kurara and Kinta lost their transformations but gained new moves to replace them. Otane is also made playable. There is one new playable character, Kuroko, and a new playable boss, Chuck, bringing the cast to 16 characters.

The battles are in teams of two characters, a leader and a partner. This plays out similarly to The King of Fighters, where you fight with each character one after the other. A Super Block and a Charge Attack were brought into the gameplay. A Super Block can nullify the opponent's blow and allow for a counterattack, and a Charge Attack can immediately knock down the opponent or launch them into the air for another attack. All of the characters were given new special attacks, though the majority of them were exclusive to this game.

In Japan, Game Machine listed Gogetsuji Legends on their October 15, 1995 issue as being the fourteenth most-successful arcade game of the month.

Groove on Fight 

Fully titled , this was a Japan exclusive. The story takes place 20 years after the last Gōketsuji tournament. It has a darker and more serious tone than its predecessors, similar to that of Garou: Mark of the Wolves, but still maintains some of the same humor that is particular to the series. Otane and Oume are the only returning characters, fighting as a single entry as they tied themselves back-to-back to each other.

The players can choose from eleven characters; all of them, save Otane/Oume, are new. The graphic style of Groove on Fight is very different from its predecessors, as the sprites are smaller, but are more fluid and have an animated look to them.

The Sega Saturn port of the game included some features like being able to play as Damian, Bristol Weller, and Bristol-D once the player beats the game with certain characters, the possibility of four players to play at the same time by way of the Saturn's multi-tap and an "Omake Mode" where the players can view artwork of the characters for the game. The Saturn version also features an arranged version of the soundtrack that has some new music themes that were not present in the original, like the theme "Mystic" and the vocal version of the title song.

New characters 
 Larry Light (ラリー・ライト) – A brilliant and optimistic man good with cultural conversations, Larry finds true happiness as more important than wealth or power. Larry's partner is Chris Wayne, a conflictual young man. He once helped Chris from being arrested for vandalism. Since then, Larry has been Chris's tutor and best friend. After losing against Oume in the previous Goketsuji finals five years ago, Larry received another invitation for a new tag battle tournament signed by Oume.
 Chris Wayne (クリス・ウェイン) – An extremely violent boy and leader of a powerful gang in the Bronx, New York, Chris is able to hurt anyone at the drop of a hat. He often has troubles with his parents Keith and Annie due to his bad behavior. To distance from them, he accompanied his professor and friend Larry in his journey. Chris had told his parents that the journey was for "educational purposes". Chris eagerly joins Larry to join the new Goketsuji tournament.
  - The eldest son of the Tenjinbashi family chairman. When his father died, he took over the role of leader at a very young age. His family had ties to the Japanese Yakuza connected to the Goketsuji Family, but Sujiroku has no interest in their business. He wants to enjoy celebrating in festivals and participating in as many Japanese cultural events, traveling with a lion mask and drumsticks. In one festival, he met a young man who respected his work in preserving Japanese culture and proposed to join him in a martial arts tag tournament as his partner. 
  – A young man obsessed with ninjas, a trait he got from his father. He is also fan of video games, manga, anime, and collecting soda cans. In fact, all of his fighting techniques are based on characters from various anime series, and he based his hair style on a character from a manga. While attending a summer festival, he met the master of ceremonies, and both felt mutual respect over their love of Japanese traditions. Hizumi told Sujiroku about a pending tournament and suggested that he be his partner to propagate the beauty of Japanese culture.
 Solis R8000 (ソーリス=R8000) - A young police woman from the year 2115, Solis investigates the activities of a powerful organization suspected of tampering past events for its convenience. Thus she discovered that this organization was responsible for the disappearance of important families and financial groups 100 years ago; among these the Goketsuji Clan. Learning that she was a Goketsuji descendant, Solis travels back to the year 2015 to prevent the destruction of her clan. During the travel, her time machine malfunctioned and set her in a different time period where she met a mysterious scientist named Max Ax Dax. Solis asked Max if he could help her to repair her machine.
 M.A.D. – A mysterious scientist whose real name is Max Ax Dax, his lab was located near the place where Solis's time machine crashed. He volunteered to fix the machine while Solis had contacted the Goketsuji twins, who invited her to the new tag tournament. When Solis asks M.A.D. to be her partner, he accepts: a perfect way for him to get more experimental guinea pigs.
  – Kurara's daughter, and a magical witch just like her mother. Popura has learned from her mother all of her magic tricks and fighting techniques. Her father has been traveling since she was a baby. Wishing to see her father, Popura decided to travel around the world with the hope to find him while bringing her father's gift for her: a very special teddy bear. After Kurara has mentioned her participation on a prestigious tournament, Popura invited her fellow magical classmate Remi as her partner to join the tournament. If she wins, it might be one step closer to finding her father.
  – The only daughter of a high class family with a deep hidden secret: they are descendants of an evil witch. Her calm and classy demeanor made her one of the most popular students in her school, motivated to show the power of music. She also met her classmate Popura there, who also has magical powers, whom she became best friends quickly. After hearing about the adventures of Popura's mother, Popura invites Remi to the tournament as her partner. If they win, that would earn her enough money to hold concerts around the world and help the poor.
 Falco (ファルコ)– An old man, expert at any kind of table game like cards or mahjong. Falco met the Goketsuji twins at Otane's casino, where he won against Oume in a poker game. Bitter at her loss, Oume attacked Falco but he was able to read through Oume's moves. Impressed by his skills, the twins employed Falco as their partner in the new Goketsuji tournament.
 Rudolph Gartheimer (ルドルフ・ガルテイマー) – A ruthless man feared by everyone who knew him. The only person who has seen his tender side is his young servant, Damian. Once part of the Goketsuji clan, his family fell of the graces of Oume and were subsequently banished from the clan. The Gartheimers lost everything. However, his family recovered their wealth eventually but Rudolph still held great hatred for the Goketsujis especially Oume. He seeks to win the tournament to grab the family fortune and destroy the Goketsuji clan.
 Damian Shade (ダミアン・シェード)– Rudolph's servant, secret lover and tag team partner, although he never gets the opportunity to fight, being shot by Bristol as soon as Rudolph is defeated. Damian was an orphan adopted by the Gartheimer family. With time, he became a very special person to his master, Rudolph. Damian is a pacifist and abhors violence, but his personality totally changes if somebody injures Rudolph. His ability enables him to heal a living being through his touch. The Saturn version of the game allows Damian to fight, as a secret character.
 Bristol Weller (ブリストル・ウェラー) – Born from a family of aristocrats, Bristol grew into a very intelligent and shrewd hypocrite. Since a young age he achieved a good social status and has received several awards for his charity activities, but all of this is a merely a front for his heartless ambitions. Even with his success as a Gartheimer company partner, Bristol had entered a pact with demons to rain destruction and exterminate anyone and anything to get what he wants.
 Bristol-D (ブリストル-D) – After Bristol has been beaten once, his true identity is revealed as Bristol-D, a vampire and demon summoner. He captures and brainwashes your partner into a sickly blue-skinned hue, forcing him/her to fight alongside him. To make sure that chaos reigns in the world, he has the power to create portals to summon demons from the underworld. These armies of darkness are in fact characters from Atlus's Shin Megami Tensei franchise.

Gameplay 
Gameplay is in a 2-on-2 format much like Legends, but with the ability to tag in and out at any time between players, similar to X-Men vs. Street Fighter. Whenever the player tags successfully between characters, the character who is on the sidelines slowly begins to get his or her energy back.

A big difference from the previous games is that Groove on Fight has a six buttons system. The two new buttons are for "Dodge" and for the "Powerful Blow", but are also used for stronger versions of special moves. the "Dodge" allows the characters to evade attacks and then counterattack the opponent. The "Powerful Blow" is an attack that inflicts more damage to the opponent than the normal strong attacks, but is also slower. The special guard and the shadow moves from Gogetsuji Legends are still present in the game and some other new characteristics were introduced to the gameplay:

Matrimelee

This new sequel, fully titled  in Japan, brings back the roster from Power Instinct 2 (except Angela, Oshima, Sahad and Kinta, the latter of whom was replaced by his alter-ego, Pochi), plus 4 totally new characters and one new boss (Princess Sissy). However, all the characters introduced in Groove of Fight were discarded. Jimmy, Elias, Lynn and Jones from Rage of the Dragons are guest stars, and are unlockable. A few of the game elements were borrowed from that same game as well. The western releases drop the Shin Gouketsuji Ichizoku title and remains named simply as Matrimelee (though the Toukon mark still appears). Released in 2003, it was one of the last games to be released on the Neo Geo.

It was followed by PlayStation 2 port . It was released exclusively in Japan. It features enhanced graphics and sound, the return of two of the older characters (Angela Belti and Kinta Kokuin), a new boss (Bobby Strong), and the return of the transformation feature. Gameplay was also improved in some areas, and super attacks were made easier to execute. The game has the same backgrounds and all the characters from Matrimelee (except the four secret characters from Rage of the Dragons), and because of that it is usually described as a port of the game, while in fact the game's story takes place after the events from the previous game, making it a sort of sequel or update. The game tells the story of the king from the previous game, who holds a "Bonnou Kaihou" ("Liberation of Lusts") tournament to cheer up his daughter Princess Sissy. This time the prize is anything that the winner could wish for (except the throne succession).

New characters 
  – A delinquent schoolboy who enters the tournament to meet his idol, Reiji Oyama.
  – Buntaro's younger brother and also a delinquent schoolboy, he enters the tournament to defeat his brother.
  – A tomboy student who fights with a cane and enters the tournament to prove she is the best fighter.
 Olof Linderoth (オロフ・リンデロート) – Princess Sissy's bodyguard, who demands him to enter the tournament to test himself.
 Princess Sissy (プリンセス・シシー) – The Princess of Certain Country, trained to be the successor of the throne.

Gōketsuji Ichizoku: Senzo Kuyō 

 is currently the latest game in the series. It refocuses on the Gōketsuji clan, with Oume announcing a new tournament to honour the clan's common progenitor, Shinjūrō Gōketsuji. The combo system is now an aerial-based, akin to Arc System Works’ previous fighting games, such as Guilty Gear. Several new characters were introduced:

 Sandra Belti (サンドラ・ベルテ) – An 82-year-old lady, grandmother of Angela Belti. She has the ability to transform in their younger self (Super Sandra), just like the Gōketsuji sisters.
 Elizabeth Belti (エリザベス・ベルテ) – Sandra's younger sister, grandaunt of Angela Belti. Elizabeth also has the ability to transform to her younger self (Super Elizabeth).
 Prince (プリンス) – Princess Sissy's older brother. He appeared in some of the endings in Power Instinct: Matrimelee, and makes his playable debut in this game. He can transform in a "good looking" version of himself (Super Prince), which gives him different gameplay.
  - Reiji Oyama's niece. She started practicing karate with her uncle since she was four years old.
  – Saizo Hattori's cousin. Just like his cousin, this eight-year-old kid is very shy and wears a mask most of the time.
 : A century years old progenitor of Gōketsuji descendants and the son of Yagyu Jubei, who became an immortal blue skinned oni. Initially, his first form is that of a tiny shrivelled sokushinbutsu. While in battle, he becomes a muscular giant who can produce electrokinesis, similar to a Japanese folklore. He is currently non-playable since his debut.

Merchandise 
Various merchandise based on the series has been released in Japan. The 253-page 1995 novel Gouketsuji Ichizoku: The Novel was published by Wani Books in 1995. It relates the history of the Gōketsuji family and features some art made by Range Murata. Gōketsuji Ichizoku: THE CD-ROM was published in 1998 by Toshiba EMI and contains information about the series including characters profiles, correlation diagrams, the family lineage, concept art, sounds and other artwork. It also has desktop wallpapers and screen savers.

Soundtracks to the first five games in the series were also released. Pony Canyon/Scitron released the first four, while Noise Factory released the Matrimelee soundtrack. In 2005, Noise Factory released a box set of all soundtracks to the first five games in the series, along with a 2005 calendar featuring art from them. Unlike the original releases, the CDs in the box set do not include the sound effects collections and the Groove on Fight's CD has the arranged tracks from the Sega Saturn.

References

External links
  
 Atlus' website for Gōketsuji Ichizoku: Senzo Kuyō 
 Noise Factory's website for Gōketsuji Ichizoku: Senzo Kuyō 
 Game Excite's website for Shin Gōketsuji Ichizoku: Bonnō Kaihō 
 Noise Factory's website for Shin Gōketsuji Ichizoku: Bonnō Kaihō 
 

1993 video games
Arcade video games
Atlus games
Fighting games
Neo Geo games
PlayStation (console) games
PlayStation 2 games
Sega Games franchises
Sega Saturn games
Sega Genesis games
Super Nintendo Entertainment System games
Tag team videogames
Video game franchises
Video games developed in Japan
Virtual Console games
Virtual Console games for Wii U